Shelly Green is a settlement in the West Midlands conurbation, although it was not considered as such until the late 1990s. As of 2001 it had a population of 5,702.

References

West Midlands (region)